This is a list of notable collegiate outing (outdoors) clubs, a student society centered on outdoor recreation.

New Zealand
Canterbury University Tramping Club

United States
Dartmouth Outing Club
New Hampshire Outing Club
On the Loose (Claremont Colleges)
Society of Les Voyageurs (University of Michigan)
Wisconsin Hoofers Outing Club

References

External links
Directory of IOCA Clubs, a more exhaustive list maintained by the Intercollegiate Outing Club Association

 
Lists of student societies